Sorbus pseudohupehensis, the Chinese mountain ash, is a species of rowan native to Yunnan province in China. Available from commercial suppliers under a variety of names, it has gained the Royal Horticultural Society's Award of Garden Merit as an ornamental.

References

pseudohupehensis
Plants described in 2005
Endemic flora of Yunnan